Agyneta pseudorurestris is a species of sheet weaver found in Portugal, Spain, Cyprus, Sardinia, Algeria, Tunisia and Israel. It was described by Wunderlich in 1980.

References

pseudorurestris
Spiders described in 1980
Spiders of Europe
Spiders of Asia
Spiders of Africa